Fushan Village is a village in Zuoying District, Kaohsiung, Taiwan. This is Taiwan's most populated village with 43,400 people and an area of 1.8 square kilometers. Fushan Village has 65 neighborhoods which is also the nation's highest number of neighborhoods in one village.

Fushan Village has 16,600 households.

See also
 Administrative divisions of the Republic of China

References

Geography of Kaohsiung
Villages in Taiwan
Zuoying District